Five United States Navy ships have borne the name USS Lawrence in honor of James Lawrence.

 was a brig which acted as Commodore Oliver Perry's flagship during the first part of the Battle of Lake Erie until she became unmanageable in that action.
 was also a brig decommissioned in 1846.
 was a 400-ton , commissioned in 1903 and serving until 1920.
 was a  commissioned in 1962, and serving until 1994.

See also 
 , a brig in commission from 1848 to 1865.
 , an  launched in 2009.

United States Navy ship names